Elías Fernando Aguilar Vargas (born 7 November 1991) is a Costa Rican professional footballer who plays for the Incheon United.

Career
He was called up to the Costa Rica team for the 2015 CONCACAF Gold Cup; he played in Costa Rica's opening game.

In February 2018 he joined K League 1 side Incheon United on a 10 month loan deal.

International career

International goals
Scores and results list Costa Rica's goal tally first.

References

External links
 

1991 births
Living people
Costa Rican men's footballers
Costa Rica international footballers
2015 CONCACAF Gold Cup players
2017 Copa Centroamericana players
2019 CONCACAF Gold Cup players
C.S. Herediano footballers
Atlético Zacatepec footballers
Incheon United FC players
Jeju United FC players
Liga FPD players
K League 1 players
Costa Rican expatriate footballers
Costa Rican expatriate sportspeople in Mexico
Costa Rican expatriate sportspeople in South Korea
Expatriate footballers in Mexico
Expatriate footballers in South Korea
People from Heredia (canton)
Association football midfielders